Kellé is a city and seat of Kelle District in the Cuvette-Ouest Region of northeastern Republic of the Congo.

The city is served by Kelle Airport.

Cuvette-Ouest Department
Populated places in the Republic of the Congo